Ceuta was the name of four steamships of the Oldenburg Portuguese Line.

, seized as a war prize in 1920
, sold in 1927
, seized as a war prize in 1945
, sold in 1971.

Ship names